Phalaenopsis kunstleri is a species of orchid found from Myanmar to peninsular Malaysia.

External links
 
 

kunstleri